Simón Lecue Andrade (11 February 1912 – 27 February 1984) was a Spanish footballer who played as an attacking midfielder.

Club career
Born in Arrigorriaga, Biscay, Lecue played his first two La Liga seasons with Deportivo Alavés, also in the Basque Country. He made his professional debut at the age of 18, after being signed from CD Basconia.

Lecue joined Real Betis in 1932, contributing with nine goals in 21 games as the Andalusians won their first and only top division championship in 1934–35, under the guidance of Irish manager Patrick O'Connell. After that final third campaign, he left the club.

Subsequently, Lecue moved to Real Madrid where he continued to feature regularly, scoring a career-best 12 goals in his second year – the competition was not held from 1936 to 1939 due to the Spanish Civil War – with the team finally coming empty in silverware. After four seasons at Valencia CF, where he won his second league in 1944, he finished his career in 1949 at the age of 37, after brief spells with amateurs AR Chamberí and Real Zaragoza; in 13 top division campaigns, he amassed totals of 250 matches and 59 goals.

Lecue died in Madrid at the age of 72, after suffering a stroke whilst in his home.

International career
Lecue earned seven caps for Spain during two years, scoring once. He was picked for the squad that appeared in the 1934 FIFA World Cup, with the national side exiting in the quarter-finals after losing against eventual champions (and hosts) Italy.

Lecue's debut was on 27 May 1934 precisely in that tournament, in a 3–1 first round win against Brazil in Genoa.

Honours
Betis
La Liga: 1934–35

Valencia
La Liga: 1943–44

Real Madrid
Copa del Rey: 1936

References

External links

1912 births
1984 deaths
People from Arrigorriaga
Spanish footballers
Footballers from the Basque Country (autonomous community)
Association football midfielders
La Liga players
Tercera División players
CD Basconia footballers
Deportivo Alavés players
Real Betis players
Real Madrid CF players
Valencia CF players
Hércules CF players
Real Zaragoza players
Spain international footballers
1934 FIFA World Cup players
Catalonia international guest footballers
Sportspeople from Biscay